The Gauliga Niederrhein was the highest football league in the northern part of the Prussian Rhine Province from 1933 to 1945. Shortly after the formation of the league, the Nazis reorganised the administrative regions in Germany, and the Gaue Essen and Düsseldorf replaced the Prussian province in the Lower Rhein (German: Niederrhein) region.

Overview
The league was introduced by the Nazi Sports Office in 1933, after the Nazi takeover of power in Germany. It replaced the Bezirksligas and Oberligas as the highest level of play in German football competitions.

While the Gauliga Niederrhein covered a small area in size, the region had a substantial population. The most successful club from the region was Fortuna Düsseldorf, reaching the national championship final in 1936 and the cup final in 1937, both times coming out as the loser. No other club from the region reached a German final in this era.

In its first season, the league had twelve clubs, playing each other once at home and once away. The league champion then qualified for the German championship. The bottom three teams were relegated. The season after, the league was reduced to eleven, then ten teams. From 1935 to 1942, the modus and strength of the league did not alter, making it one of the few Gauligas which remained unaffected by the outbreak of World War II  in 1939.

In the 1942–43 season, the league was reduced to nine clubs but returned to its old strength the season after.

The imminent collapse of Nazi Germany in 1945 gravely affected all Gauligas. The Gauliga Niederrhein retained its single-division, ten-team format even for its last season, too, but after only having played one round, the league was halted and did not resume again.

Aftermath
With the end of the Nazi era, the Gauligas ceased to exist and the region found itself in the British occupation zone. Top-level football did not resume straight away, unlike in Southern Germany, and only in 1947 was a new, highest league introduced, the Oberliga West, which covered all of the new state of North Rhine-Westphalia.

Founding members of the league
The twelve founding members and their league positions in the 1932–33 season were:
 VfL 06 Benrath
 Fortuna Düsseldorf, champion Bergisch-Mark division, German champion 1932-33
 SV Hamborn 07, champion Niederrhein division
 TSV Duisburg 99
 Borussia München-Gladbach
 Duisburger FV 08
 Schwarz-Weiß Essen
 Preußen Krefeld
 Rheydter SV
 BV Preußen Altenessen
 Alemannia Aachen
 Schwarz-Weiß Barmen

Winners and runners-up of the Gauliga Niederrhein
The winners and runners-up of the league:

Placings in the Gauliga Niederrhein 1933-44
The complete list of all clubs participating in the league:

 1 Alemannia Aachen played in the Gauliga Mittelrhein from 1937.
 2 SSV Ebersfeld became SSV Wuppertal in 1938.
 3 The following “war sport unions” (German: KSG) were formed between clubs in September 1943:
 TuS Duisburg 48/99 and Duisburger SV formed KSG SpV/48/99 Duisburg.
 Hamborn 07 and Union Hamborn formed KSG Hamborn.
 RW Essen and BV Altenessen formed KSG Essen.
 RW Oberhausen and Elmar Oberhausen formed KSG Oberhausen.

References

Sources
 Die deutschen Gauligen 1933-45 - Heft 1-3  Tables of the Gauligas 1933–45, publisher: DSFS
 Kicker Almanach,  The yearbook on German football from Bundesliga to Oberliga, since 1937, published by the Kicker Sports Magazine

External links
  The Gauligas Das Deutsche Fussball Archiv
 Germany - Championships 1902-1945 at RSSSF.com

Sports leagues established in 1933
1933 establishments in Germany
1945 disestablishments in Germany
Gauliga
Football competitions in North Rhine-Westphalia